Mar. 31 - Eastern Orthodox liturgical calendar - Apr. 2

All fixed commemorations below celebrated on April 14 by Orthodox Churches on the Old Calendar.{{#tag:ref|The notation Old Style or (OS) is sometimes used to indicate a date in the Julian Calendar (which is used by churches on the ii"Old Calendar").

The notation New Style or (NS), indicates a date in the Revised Julian calendar (which is used by churches on the "New Calendar").|group=note}}

For April 1, Orthodox Churches on the Old Calendar commemorate the Saints listed on March 19.

Saints

 Saints Hermes and Theodora the martyrs (132)Rev. Sabine Baring-Gould (M.A.). "S. Theodora, V.M. (A.D. 132.)." In: The Lives of the Saints. Volume the Fourth: April. London: John C. Nimmo, 1897. pp. 1-2.
 Saint Melito of Sardis, Bishop of Sardis (177)
 Martyrs Gerontius and Basilides (3rd century)Great Synaxaristes:  Οἱ Ἅγιοι Βασιλείδης καὶ Γερόντιος οἱ Μάρτυρες. 1 Απριλίου. Μεγασ Συναξαριστησ.
 Saints Alexander, Dionysius, Ingeniani, Panteros (or Pantainos), Parthenios and Saturninus the Martyrs.
 Martyr Polynikos.
 Righteous Achaz (Ahaz)
 Saint Mary of Egypt (c. 421)Great Synaxaristes:  Ἡ Ὁσία Μαρία ἡ Αἰγυπτία. 1 Απριλίου. ΜεγΑσ Συναξαριστησ.
 Saint Makarios of Pelekete, Abbot of Pelekete monastery (820)Great Synaxaristes:  Ὁ Ὅσιος Μακάριος ἡγούμενος τῆς μονῆς Πελεκητῆς. 1 Απριλίου. ΜεΓασ Συναξριστησ.
 Saint Procopius of Sázava, Abbot of Sázava in Bohemia (1053)April 1. Latin Saints of the Orthodox Patriarchate of Rome.  (see also: July 4 - West)

Pre-Schism Western saints

 Venantius, a Dalmatian bishop whose relics were brought from Spalato to Rome in 641 (c. 255)
 Saint Walric (Walericus, Valéry), Abbot of Leuconay (Saint-Valery-sur-Somme) (622)Rev. Sabine Baring-Gould (M.A.). "S. Walaric Ab. of Leucony. (About A.D. 619.)." In: The Lives of the Saints. Volume the Fourth: April. London: John C. Nimmo, 1897. pp. 3-6.
 Saints Caidoc and Fricor (Adrian), Welsh missionaries (7th century)Very Rev. John O'Hanlon. "Article I.—St. Caidoc, and St. Fricor, or Adrien, Apostles of the Morini, in France. (Sixth and Seventh Centuries.]." In: Lives of the Irish Saints: With Special Festivals, and the Commemorations of Holy Persons. VOL. IV. Dublin, 1875. pp. 1-5.
 Saint Dodolinus of Vienne, Bishop of Vienne in the Dauphiné in France (7th century)
 Saint Cellach (Cellach mac Congaile), Archbishop of Armagh in Ireland, previously the Abbot of Iona in Scotland and founder of the Monastery of Kells (815)Very Rev. John O'Hanlon. "Article II.—St. Ceallach, or Kellachus, Archbishop of Armagh, County of Armagh. [Ninth Century.]." In: Lives of the Irish Saints: With Special Festivals, and the Commemorations of Holy Persons. VOL. IV. Dublin, 1875. pp. 5-7.

Post-Schism Orthodox saints

 Saint John Shavteli of Salosi (John of Black Mountain), Georgia (12th-13th century)St John Shavteli of Salosi, Bishop of Gaenati, Georgia. OCA - Feasts and Saints.
 Saint Eulogius of Salosi, Georgia, (Eulogius the Prophet), Fool-for-Christ (12th-13th century)
 Martyr Abraham of Bulgaria, on the Volga, Wonderworker of Vladimir (1229)Great Synaxaristes:  Ὁ Ἅγιος Ἀβραάμιος ὁ Νεομάρτυρας ἐκ Βουλγαρίας. 1 Απριλίου. Μεγασ Συναξαριστησ.
 Saint Gerontius of the Kiev Caves, Canonarch of the Kiev Caves (14th century)Great Synaxaristes:  Ὁ Ὅσιος Γερόντιος ὁ Κανονάρχης. 1 Απριλίου. Απριλίου. ΜεδΓε.
 Saint Euthymius the Wonderworker, Archimandrite of Suzdal (1404)Great Synaxaristes:  Ὁ Ὅσιος Εὐθύμιος ὁ Θαυματουργός. 1 Απριλίου. Μεγασ ΣυναΞαριστησ.
 Saint Pachomius (Romansky), Archbishop of Roman and Galați, Moldavia, and monk of the Kiev Caves (1724) Sfantul Cuvios Ierarh Pahomie de la Gledin. CrestinOrtodox.ro. Retrieved: 18 May 2020. (see also: April 14 - Romanian)
 Saint Barsanuphius of Optina, Elder (1913)Great Synaxaristes:  Ὁ Ὅσιος Βαρσανούφιος τῆς Ὄπτινα. 1 Απριλίου. Μεγασ Συναξαριστησ.

New martyrs and confessors

 New martyr Michael (Misha), Fool-for-Christ (1931)
 New Hieromartyr Sergius (Zavarin), Archpriest, of Yaroslavl (1938) 1 апреля (ст.ст.) 14 апреля 2013 (нов. ст.) . Русская Православная Церковь Отдел внешних церковных связей. (DECR).
 New Hiero-confessor Schema-bishop Macarius (Vasiliev), at the Pskov Caves Monastery (1944)Great Synaxaristes:  Ὁ Ὅσιος Μακάριος ὁ Ἱερομάρτυρας ὁ Νέος. 1 Απριλίου. Μεγασ ΣυναΞαριστησ. 

Icon gallery

Notes

References

Sources 
 April 1/14. Orthodox Calendar Pravoslavie.ru).
 April 14 / April 1. Holy Trinity Russian Orthodox Church (A parish of the Patriarchate of Moscow).
 April 1. OCA - The Lives of the Saints.
 April 1. Latin Saints of the Orthodox Patriarchate of Rome.
 The Roman Martyrology. Transl. by the Archbishop of Baltimore. Last Edition, According to the Copy Printed at Rome in 1914. Revised Edition, with the Imprimatur of His Eminence Cardinal Gibbons. Baltimore: John Murphy Company, 1916. p. 93.
 Rev. Richard Stanton. A Menology of England and Wales, or, Brief Memorials of the Ancient British and English Saints Arranged According to the Calendar, Together with the Martyrs of the 16th and 17th Centuries. London: Burns & Oates, 1892. p. 140.
Greek Sources
 Great Synaxaristes:  1 Απριλιου. Μεγασ Συναξαριστησ.
  Συναξαριστής. 1 Απριλίου.'' Ecclesia. (H Εκκλησια Τηε Ελλαδοσ). 
Russian Sources
  14 апреля (1 апреля). Православная Энциклопедия под редакцией Патриарха Московского и всея Руси Кирилла (электронная версия). (Orthodox Encyclopedia - Pravenc.ru).
  1 апреля (ст.ст.) 14 апреля 2013 (нов. ст.) . Русская Православная Церковь Отдел внешних церковных связей. (DECR).

April in the Eastern Orthodox calendar